Kaaval Geetham is a 1992 Tamil-language romantic action film directed by S. P. Muthuraman, starring Vikram and Sithara. The film was released on 14 February 1992.

Plot 

Priya is a crime journalist. She is investigating the rape and murder of a victim whose face has been disfigured through acid. Inspector Ashok is assigned to the same jurisdiction.  He saves Priya from the murderer's henchmen, arrests the murderer and begins courtship with Priya. One day Arthanari, a house husband, comes to Ashok suspecting that his neighbor Ramesh may have murdered his wife after a loud quarrel.

Priya and Ashok stumble upon a little girl who happens to be the daughter of Ramesh. Investigations reveal that the girl's mother Thangam was cheated by Ramesh in the village. Ramesh and his girlfriend Rathna successfully kills Thangam and tries to do the same to the little girl but gets saved by Ashok. As the criminal investigation proceeds, Ramesh slowly removes witnesses by various unscrupulous means. What transpires later forms the crux of the story.

Cast 
Vikram as Inspector Ashok
Sithara as Priya
 Devisri as Thangam Ramesh
Charle as David
Chinni Jayanth as Arthanari
Sai Kumar as Ramesh
Disco Shanti as Rathna
M. S. Bhaskar as Purse snatcher
Shanmugasundaram
M.R.K.
Sethu Vinayagam
Surekha
Sudha

Production 
In a 2013 interview, Vikram revealed that he signed the film, hoping that it would mark a comeback for the celebrated director S. P. Muthuraman. In a 2015 interview, Vikram revealed that it took him 23 takes to say the phrase "sir" for a scene in the film. He later thanked the director for giving him a chance.

Soundtrack 
The film had six songs composed by Ilaiyaraaja. The songs were written by Vaali and Piraisoodan.

References

External links 
 

1990s romantic action films
1990s Tamil-language films
1992 films
Films directed by S. P. Muthuraman
Films scored by Ilaiyaraaja
Indian romantic action films